The Unión de Impresores de Filipinas (UIF, English: Printers' Union of the Philippines) was one of the first national trade union centers in the Philippines, along with the Unión Obrera Democrática Filipina. Established in 1906, it was a national union of all workers in the printing trade intended to consolidate them into a single confederation.

History
The first labor union in the Philippines, called Unión Democrática de Litógrafos, Impresores, Encuadernadores y Otros Obreros (in Spanish), was established in either December 1901 or in January 1902 by Isabelo de los Reyes. Not long after its founding, the members reorganized themselves into Unión Obrera Democrática (later Unión Obrera Democrática Filipina) as a trade union federation.

Hermenegildo Cruz is credited with conceiving the idea for a national trade union center as an ultimate solution to the problems labor leaders were encountering in the consolidation of its members. Following the disintegration of the Unión Obrera Democrática Filipina, in 1906, such a union for the printing trade, called Unión de Impresores de Filipinas, was re-established during a meeting held in Santa Cruz, Manila, this time as a confederation. Felipe Mendoza, a lithographer and Cruz's right-hand man, was elected president. Crisanto Evangelista, a typesetter, was Secretary-General; this was the first occasion Evagelista was associated with the labor movement as a leader. Ciriaco Cruz was indicated as an official, however his position is not mentioned in the records. In 1918, the UIF had an election and reshuffling of officers.

See also
Congreso Obrero de Filipinas
Partido Obrero de Filipinas
Unión Obrera Democrática Filipina

References

Trade unions established in 1906
National trade-union centers of the Philippines
1906 establishments in the Philippines